The West Wight Potter 19 is an American trailerable sailboat that was designed by Herb Stewart as a cruiser and first built in 1971.

Stewart developed the boat from the West Wight Potter 14, a British design he had bought the US rights to. The design was originally marketed by the manufacturer as the HMS 18.

Production
The design has been built by International Marine in Inglewood, California, United States since 1971 and remained in production in 2019, with more than 1600 completed.

Design

The West Wight Potter 19 is a recreational keelboat, with a hard chine hull, built predominantly of fiberglass, with wood trim. It has a fractional sloop rig, a spooned raked stem, a vertical transom, a transom-hung rudder controlled by a tiller, and a vertically lifting fin keel. It displaces  and carries  of ballast. It is equipped with closed cell foam flotation and is unsinkable.

The keel is retracted from the cockpit by a winch and fully retracts.

The boat is normally fitted with a small  outboard motor for docking and maneuvering.

The galley consists of a sink to port and single-burner butane stove to starboard. There is sleeping accommodation for four people and seating for five and a potable head. The manufacturer claims the boat can be rigged and launched from its trailer in 45 minutes and can also be single-handly rigged and launched.

Operational history
A 2008 review by John Kretschmer noted, "while plenty of Potters have made impressive passages, most are sailed quietly on lakes, bays and coastline all over the country. Most importantly, they're almost universally admired by the folks who own them, and for good reason. The boat is stable in the water, it can stand up to a breeze, it's surprisingly commodious, it's easy to launch and can be trailed behind almost any vehicle. Mounted on its trailer the West Wight Potter 19 fits snugly in most garages, which eliminates the cost of dockage and winter storage."

Mike Brown wrote a review of the design in 2009, stating, "it might not have the catchiest of names, but I found everything else about the West Wight Potter 19 delightful ... I am completely sold on the Potter 19, and I despair for the taste of our boating population if it does not sell in numbers. It was one of the few review boats I had to be politely ejected from. I did not want to go home.".

In a 2010 review Steve Henkel wrote, "best features: The WWP 19 shares many of the positive features listed for the WWP 15 ... including the ability to sail in adverse conditions (up to a point). Her longer LOD, higher headroom, and two feet of extra beam relieve some (but perhaps not all) of the claustrophobic feeling of the WWP 15 ... Worst features: The WWP 19's high, slab-sided hull—which of course give her a lot more than her share of cabin space—detract from her looks. And we wonder what the damage would be to her keel trunk if her vertically sliding keel collided with a rock ledge at five or six knots."

In a 2019 review Tom Lochhaas wrote, "of the wide variety of small trailerable sailboats on the market, the Potter 19 better meets the needs of owners who want to do some cruising than almost others, which at this length are typically designed more for daysailing than overnighting."

See also
List of sailing boat types

Similar sailboats
Com-Pac 19
Core Sound 20 Mark 3
Cornish Shrimper 19
Halman 20
Mariner 19
Mercury 18
Sanibel 18

References

External links

Keelboats
1970s sailboat type designs
Sailing yachts
Trailer sailers
Sailboat type designs by Herb Stewart
Sailboat types built by International Marine